The 1954 South American Basketball Championship for Women was the 5th regional tournament for women in South America. It was held in São Paulo, Brazil and won by the local squad. Five teams competed.

Final rankings

Results

Each team played the other teams once, for a total of four games played by each team.

External links
FIBA Archive

South
B
South American Basketball Championship for Women
South American Basketball Championship for Women
International sports competitions in São Paulo
South American Basketball Championship for Women
20th century in São Paulo